1894 in sports describes the year's events in world sport.

Athletics
USA Outdoor Track and Field Championships

American football
College championship
 College football national championship – Yale Bulldogs

Professional championships
 Western Pennsylvania champions – Allegheny Athletic Association

Events
 The 1894 Harvard–Yale game, known as the "Hampden Park Blood Bath", results in crippling injuries for four players; the contest is suspended until 1897. The annual Army–Navy Game is suspended from 1894 till 1898 for similar reasons.  One of the major problems is the popularity of mass formations like the flying wedge, in which a large number of offensive players charge as a unit against a similarly arranged defense.  The resultant collisions often lead to serious injury and sometimes even death.

Association football
Austria
 Foundation of First Vienna FC, which is the oldest club in Austria (22 August).
England
 The Football League – Aston Villa 44 points, Sunderland 38, Derby County 36, Blackburn Rovers 34, Burnley 34, Everton 33
 FA Cup final – Notts County 4–1 Bolton Wanderers at Goodison Park
 The Football League expands the Second Division from 15 to 16 clubs ahead of the 1894–95 season.  Darwen and Newton Heath (Manchester United) are relegated from the First Division while Liverpool and Small Heath (Birmingham City) are promoted.  Middlesbrough Ironopolis and Northwich Victoria are expelled from the league and three new clubs are elected: Bury, Burton Wanderers (league membership 1894–97) and Leicester Fosse (Leicester City). 
 The Southern League is founded prior to the 1894–95 season.  Some of its early members will eventually join the Football League.
Scotland
 Scottish Football League – Celtic
 Scottish Cup – Rangers 3–1 Celtic at Hampden Park

Baseball
National championship
 Baltimore Orioles win the first of three successive National League championships 
Events
 The Temple Cup is introduced, lasting until 1897, and matches the National League winner and runner-up in a best–of–seven, post–season championship series.  It is also known as the "World's Championship Series" but it fails to gain fan support, partly because three of the four series held will be won by the league runner-up.  In 1894, runner-up New York Giants defeats champion Baltimore Orioles 4 games to 0.
 1894 is Major League Baseball's highest scoring season as Boston Beaneaters set the current record for the most runs scored in a season (1220) and another standing record with seven players scoring 100 or more runs; in addition, Philadelphia Phillies bat .349 for the season with all four outfielders above .400, but finish fourth despite the feat

Boxing
Events
 26 July — Tommy Ryan defeats "Mysterious" Billy Smith after 20 rounds at Minneapolis to win the World Welterweight Championship.  Ryan will hold the title until 1898, when he vacates it to challenge for the world middleweight title
 The inaugural World Bantamweight Champion is Jimmy Barry of Chicago who is recognised following his 28th-round knockout of Casper Leon at Lemont, Illinois on 15 September.  Barry retains the title until 1899 when he retires undefeated in the whole of his career.  The bantamweight division is for fighters weighing between 112 and 118 lb.
Lineal world champions
 World Heavyweight Championship – James J. Corbett
 World Middleweight Championship – Bob Fitzsimmons
 World Welterweight Championship – "Mysterious" Billy Smith → Tommy Ryan
 World Lightweight Championship – title vacant
 World Featherweight Championship – George Dixon
 World Bantamweight Championship – Jimmy Barry

Cricket
Events
 The inaugural South African tour of England takes place but none of its 24 matches are currently regarded as first-class fixtures.
England
 County Championship – Surrey
 Most runs – Bill Brockwell 1491 @ 38.23 (HS 128)
 Most wickets – Arthur Mold 207 @ 12.30 (BB 8–67)
 Wisden Five Young Batsmen of the Season – Bill Brockwell, Jack Brown, C B Fry, Tom Hayward, Archie MacLaren
Australia
 Sheffield Shield – South Australia
 Most runs – George Giffen 526 @ 75.14 (HS 205)
 Most wickets – Charlie Turner 30 @ 12.30 (BB 6–51)
India
 Bombay Presidency – Europeans
South Africa
 Currie Cup – Western Province
West Indies
 Inter-Colonial Tournament – not contested

Golf
Major tournaments
 British Open – John Henry Taylor
Other tournaments
 British Amateur – John Ball

Horse racing
England
 Grand National – Why Not
 1,000 Guineas Stakes – Amiable
 2,000 Guineas Stakes – Ladas
 The Derby – Ladas
 The Oaks – Amiable
 St. Leger Stakes – Throstle
Australia
 Melbourne Cup – Patron
Canada
 Queen's Plate – Joe Miller
Ireland
 Irish Grand National – The Admiral
 Irish Derby Stakes – Blairfinde
USA
 Kentucky Derby – Chant
 Preakness Stakes – Assignee
 Belmont Stakes – Henry of Navarre

Ice hockey
Events
 25 February — Ontario Hockey Association (OHA) champion Ottawa Hockey Club resigns from the association, ending Ottawa participation in OHA titles and tournaments.
 22 March 22 — In a playoff to decide the 1894 AHAC season title and the Stanley Cup, Montreal Hockey Club defeats Ottawa Hockey Club 3–1.
 March — Toronto Osgoode Hall defeats Queen's University of Kingston 3–2 to win the OHA championship.

Motor racing
Origin
 22 July — the world's first competitive motor race was the Paris to Rouen.  Although there have previously been some private events, this first real contest is organised by Paris magazine Le Petit Journal. Albert de Dion is first to arrive at Rouen in his de Dion-Bouton car, but he did not figure in the official results because his steam vehicle needed a 'stoker' and was thus ineligible. The 'official' victory was awarded to Albert Lemaître driving his 3 hp petrol engined Peugeot Type 5.
 The internal combustion engine has been developed from simple gas-fuelled designs during the preceding decades to the point where several technicians such as Karl Benz in Mannheim and the partnership of Gottlieb Daimler and Wilhelm Maybach in Stuttgart have built the first true automobiles during the 1880s.  Racing of horse-drawn carriages has been popular among its participants in the past and it is a natural progression to race the new automobiles.

Rowing
The Boat Race
 17 March — Oxford wins the 51st Oxford and Cambridge Boat Race

Rugby football
Home Nations Championship
 12th Home Nations Championship series is won by Ireland

Speed skating
Speed Skating World Championships
 Men's All-round Champion – none declared

Tennis
England
 Wimbledon Men's Singles Championship – Joshua Pim (Ireland) defeats Wilfred Baddeley (GB) 10–8 6–2 8–6
 Wimbledon Women's Singles Championship – Blanche Bingley Hillyard (GB) defeats Edith Austin (GB) 6–1 6–1
France
 French Men's Singles Championship – André Vacherot (France) defeats Gérard Brosselin (France) 1–6 6–3 6–3
USA
 American Men's Singles Championship – Robert Wrenn (USA) defeats Manliffe Goodbody (USA) 6–8 6–1 6–4 6–4
 American Women's Singles Championship – Helen Hellwig (USA) defeats Aline Terry (USA) 7–5 3–6 6–0 3–6 6–3

References

 
Sports by year